The men's 100m breaststroke SB4 event at the 2012 Summer Paralympics took place at the  London Aquatics Centre on 4 September. There were two heats; the swimmers with the eight fastest times advanced to the final.

Results

Heats
Competed from 10:54.

Heat 1

Heat 2

Final
Competed at 19:03.

 
Q = qualified for final. WR = World Record.

References
Official London 2012 Paralympics Results: Heats 
Official London 2012 Paralympics Results: Final 

Swimming at the 2012 Summer Paralympics